Frontier County is a county in the U.S. state of Nebraska. As of the 2010 United States Census, the population was 2,756. Its county seat is Stockville.

In the Nebraska license plate system, Frontier County is represented by the prefix 60 (it had the sixtieth-largest number of vehicles registered in the county when the license plate system was established in 1922).

History
Frontier County was formed in 1872. It was named for its location along the frontier border in the late 19th century.

The courthouse was completed in 1889.

Geography

Major highways

  U.S. Highway 83
  Nebraska Highway 18
  Nebraska Highway 21
  Nebraska Highway 23

Adjacent counties

 Gosper County – east
 Furnas County –southeast
 Red Willow County – south
 Hitchcock County – southwest
 Hayes County – west
 Lincoln County – north
 Dawson County – northeast

Protected areas
 Hugh Butler Lake / Red Willow Reservoir State Wildlife Management Area (part)
 Medicine Creek Reservoir State Recreation Area

Demographics

As of the 2000 United States Census, there were 3,099 people, 1,192 households, and 828 families in the county. The population density was 3 people per square mile (1/km2). There were 1,543 housing units at an average density of 2 per square mile (1/km2). The racial makeup of the county was 98.29% White, 0.10% Black or African American, 0.26% Native American, 0.26% Asian, 0.39% from other races, and 0.71% from two or more races. 0.97% of the population were Hispanic or Latino of any race. 45.8% were of German, 12.8% English, 6.3% American and 6.1% Irish ancestry.

There were 1,192 households, out of which 31.40% had children under the age of 18 living with them, 62.50% were married couples living together, 4.80% had a female householder with no husband present, and 30.50% were non-families. 26.30% of all households were made up of individuals, and 12.30% had someone living alone who was 65 years of age or older. The average household size was 2.48 and the average family size was 3.02.

The county population contained 26.00% under the age of 18, 11.30% from 18 to 24, 22.80% from 25 to 44, 23.00% from 45 to 64, and 16.90% who were 65 years of age or older. The median age was 38 years. For every 100 females there were 100.50 males. For every 100 females age 18 and over, there were 98.50 males.

The median income for a household in the county was $33,038, and the median income for a family was $38,664. Males had a median income of $25,792 versus $16,941 for females. The per capita income for the county was $16,648. About 9.30% of families and 12.20% of the population were below the poverty line, including 9.90% of those under age 18 and 8.30% of those age 65 or over.

Communities

City 

 Curtis

Villages 

 Eustis
 Maywood
 Moorefield
 Stockville (county seat)

Unincorporated communities 

 Freedom
 Orafino
 Quick

Politics
Frontier County voters are strongly Republican. In no national election since 1936 has the county selected the Democratic Party candidate (as of 2020). The polarization has increased in recent years with Republican candidate Donald Trump winning 85.0% of the vote in 2020, a record in the county.

See also
 Medicine Creek (Republican River tributary) 
 Mowry Bluff Archeological Site 
 National Register of Historic Places listings in Frontier County, Nebraska

References

 
Nebraska counties
1872 establishments in Nebraska
Populated places established in 1872